CBU may refer to:

Universities

 California Baptist University, in Riverside, California
 Christian Brothers University, in Memphis, Tennessee
 Cape Breton University, in Sydney, Nova Scotia
 Celal Bayar University, in Manisa, Turkey
 Copperbelt University, in the Copperbelt region of Zambia
 Chungbuk National University, in Cheongju, South Korea

Radio stations

 CBU (AM), a radio station (690 AM) licensed to Vancouver, British Columbia, Canada
 CBU-FM, a radio station (105.7 FM) licensed to Vancouver, British Columbia, Canada

 Other

 Cellular Backhaul Unit used in FTTx deployments
 Caribbean Broadcasting Union, a regional television co-operative.
 Cluster bombs
 Cluster box unit, a mailbox with multiple receptacles 
 Cognition and Brain Sciences Unit,  a branch of the UK Medical Research Council
 The stock ticker for Community Bank System, Inc.
 Complete Build-up Unit or Completely Built Unit, manufactured goods for export in completely built form, also known as BUX (Built up export) form
 The IATA airport code for Cottbus-Drewitz Airport
 CBU, a kind of cement board building material used particularly for bathroom installations. (CBU is said to stand for cementitious backer unit or cement backer unit, but the acronym is rarely expanded.)
 Center for By-Products Utilization (CBU) at the University of Wisconsin - Milwaukee